Normanby Hall is a classic English mansion, located near the village of Burton-upon-Stather,  north of Scunthorpe, North Lincolnshire.

History
The present hall was built in 1825–30  to the designs of Robert Smirke for Sir Robert Sheffield (1786–1862). The Sheffield family had lived on the site since 1539 and the family's titles include Dukes of Buckingham and Normanby and Sheffield baronets. It replaced a previous 17th century building.

John Sheffield became Duke of Buckingham and Normanby in 1703. He built a fine mansion in London called Buckingham House. His son, the second Duke sold the house to George III and it is now known as Buckingham Palace.

The house was extended and altered to designs by Walter Brierley between 1906 and 1908.

The Sheffield family moved out of Normanby Hall in 1963. The hall is now in the care of the North Lincolnshire Council. The former 350 acre (1.4 km2) estate around the hall is now a country park. Within it, there are a restored working Victorian walled garden, a farming museum, duck ponds, a deer sanctuary, a fishing lake, a miniature railway and a stableyard with the life-size Horse and Rider sculpture by Harold Gosney.

Samantha Cameron, wife of the former Conservative Prime Minister, David Cameron and elder daughter of the eighth Baronet, grew up on the estate.

Normanby Hall is also home to Party in the Park Festival, which takes place over the weekend of 19 and 20 July 2019, and features bands such as Toploader, tribute acts covering Little Mix and Gary Barlow, and local bands such as The Dirty Pitchers who cover Britpop hits.

Image gallery

References

External links

Normanby Hall Museum and Country Park - official site
Normanby Hall - information

Country houses in Lincolnshire
Neoclassical architecture in England
Museums in Lincolnshire
Historic house museums in Lincolnshire
Agriculture museums in the United Kingdom
Grade I listed buildings in Lincolnshire
Country parks in Lincolnshire
Gardens in Lincolnshire
Grade I listed houses